The Gausi or Gausian dynasty was a prominent Lombard ruling clan in the second half of the 6th century (547–572). They were either pagans or perhaps Arian Christians and were frequently at odds with the Roman Catholic Church. Under their rule, the Lombards first migrated into the Italian peninsula. 

The Gausi traced their lineage back to the Goths and they were a prominent family when, in 539, the tribe came under the rule of a minor, Walthari of the Lethings clan, and a Gausian, Audoin, was elected his regent. In 547, Audoin succeeded Walthari, who died young of natural causes, and assumed the royal mantle by usurpation. Audoin's son and successor, Alboin, led the Lombards into Italy in 569 and died without male heirs in 572 or 573. He had made the Lombard kings into Kings of Italy. His successor was Cleph of the Beleos clan.

The noble house of the Gausi continued through the first duke of Friuli, Gisulf I of Friuli, nephew of Alboin and grandson of Audoin. His heirs would eventually go on to secure power in the Duchy of Benevento, leading to the establishment of another Gausian king of Italy, Grimoald of Benevento

Sources
Jarnut, Jörg. Storia dei Longobardi. Turin: Einaudi, 2002.
Rovagnati, Sergio. I Longobardi. Milan: Xenia, 2003.

 
Gausian